Leucogyrophana mollusca is a fungus of the genus Leucogyrophana and family Hygrophoropsidaceae.

References

Hygrophoropsidaceae
Fungi described in 1821
Taxa named by Elias Magnus Fries